is a tram station in Nankoku, Japan.

Lines
Tosa Electric Railway
Gomen Line

Adjacent stations

|-
!colspan=5|Tosa Electric Railway

External links

Railway stations in Kōchi Prefecture
Railway stations in Japan opened in 1911